Artificial Breathing is a 2016 Georgian family drama.

Plot 
Artificial breathing is a TV miniseries that is about a young doctor named Shotiko who has had a difficult time raising his 11-year-old daughter Melano, after the tragic death of his wife.

The protagonist, Shotiko, is a paramedic with an 11-year-old daughter, Melano. Melano is a seventh-grader whose mother died when she was young. Tamuna, a journalist with dreams of writing, enters Shotiko's and Melano's lives and disturbs their peaceful existence.

Cast 
 Tornike Gogrichiani - Shotiko
 Eka Demetradze - Tamuna
 Ruska Karkashadze - Melano

Crew
 Giorgi Liponava - Director
 Dato Gerasime Gabunia - Writer
 Keti Devdariani - Writer

References

External links
 Artificial Breathing official website

2010s Georgia (country) television series